Fritz Ritterbusch (11 January 1894 – 14 May 1946) was a SS-Haupftsturmführer, a member of the crew of the Hinzert concentration camp, Lublin and Gross-Rosen and others. He was a commander of the Trautenau-Parschnitz camp.

Family
He was born in Zschakau (now Beilrode) near Torgau, Germany , a professional civil servant. His father Hermann Ritterbusch was a brickworks master from Zschakau. His brother Paul Ritterbusch was a NS-science functionary, his brother Willi Ritterbusch was general commissioner of the Netherlands 1943–1945.

SS career
He participated in World War I, serving in the 153rd and 264th Infantry Regiment. He was a member of the Sturmabteilung, NSDAP on 25 January 1925 (Member No. 6,317) and SS from 1931 (Registration No. 9,107). From early 1940 to 30 January 1941 he held an unspecified role in the Division IV camp Flossenbürg concentration camp, where then was transferred to the post of commander of one of the camp guard companies. The camp moved to the headquarters staff of Hinzert concentration camp, where he was adjutant to the commandant of the camp, Paul Sporrenberg. On 18 June 1943 he moved to KL Lublin. In March 1944, he was moved to KL Gross-Rosen where from May 1944 to 13 February 1945 he was company commander and the head of sub Parschnitz in Pozice and AL Trautenau in Trutnov in the Czech Republic. 30 January 1945 he was carried to Hauptsturmführer

He was arrested by Soviet forces on 1 January 1946. On 25 March 1946 he was sentenced to death by a Soviet Military Tribunal, a special form of a court-martial. On 14 May 1946 Ritterbusch was executed at an unknown place.

In November 2002 his trial was revisited by the Main Military State's Attorney of Russia and the sentence was confirmed.

References 

1894 births
Place of death unknown
1946 deaths
Sturmabteilung personnel
SS-Obersturmführer
Waffen-SS personnel
Majdanek concentration camp personnel
Gross-Rosen concentration camp personnel
Hinzert concentration camp personnel
Executed Nazi concentration camp personnel
Recipients of the Iron Cross (1914), 2nd class
Nazi Party members
People from Nordsachsen
Nazis executed in the Soviet Union
German Army personnel of World War I